Robert Francis Kennedy (November 20, 1925June 6, 1968), also known by his initials RFK and by the nickname Bobby, was an American lawyer and politician who served as the 64th United States Attorney General from January 1961 to September 1964, and as a U.S. Senator from New York from January 1965 until his assassination in June 1968. He was, like his brothers John and Edward, a prominent member of the Democratic Party and has come to be viewed by some historians as an icon of modern American liberalism.

Kennedy was born into a wealthy, political family in Brookline, Massachusetts. After serving in the U.S. Naval Reserve from 1944 to 1946, Kennedy returned to his studies at Harvard University, and later received his law degree from the University of Virginia. He began his career as a correspondent for The Boston Post and as a lawyer at the Justice Department, but later resigned to manage his brother John's successful campaign for the U.S. Senate in 1952. The following year, he worked as an assistant counsel to the Senate committee chaired by Senator Joseph McCarthy. He gained national attention as the chief counsel of the Senate Labor Rackets Committee from 1957 to 1959, where he publicly challenged Teamsters President Jimmy Hoffa over the union's corrupt practices. Kennedy resigned from the committee to conduct his brother's successful campaign in the 1960 presidential election. He was appointed United States Attorney General at the age of 35, one of the youngest cabinet members in American history. He served as his brother's closest advisor until the latter's 1963 assassination.

His tenure is known for advocating for the civil rights movement, the fight against organized crime and the Mafia, and involvement in U.S. foreign policy related to Cuba. He authored his account of the Cuban Missile Crisis in a book titled Thirteen Days. As attorney general, he authorized the Federal Bureau of Investigation (FBI) to wiretap Martin Luther King Jr. and the Southern Christian Leadership Conference on a limited basis. After his brother's assassination, he remained in office during the Presidency of Lyndon B. Johnson for several months. He left to run for the United States Senate from New York in 1964 and defeated Republican incumbent Kenneth Keating. In office, Kennedy opposed U.S. involvement in the Vietnam War and raised awareness of poverty by sponsoring legislation designed to lure private business to blighted communities (i.e., Bedford Stuyvesant Restoration project). He was an advocate for issues related to human rights and social justice by traveling abroad to eastern Europe, Latin America, and South Africa, and formed working relationships with Martin Luther King Jr., Cesar Chavez, and Walter Reuther.

In 1968, Kennedy became a leading candidate for the Democratic nomination for the presidency by appealing to poor, African American, Hispanic, Catholic, and young voters. His main challenger in the race was Senator Eugene McCarthy. Shortly after winning the California primary around midnight on June 5, 1968, Kennedy was mortally wounded when shot with a pistol by Sirhan Sirhan, a 24-year-old Palestinian, allegedly in retaliation for his support of Israel following the 1967 Six-Day War. Kennedy died 25 hours later. Sirhan was arrested, tried, and convicted, though Kennedy's assassination, like his brother's, continues to be the subject of widespread analysis and numerous conspiracy theories.

Early life and education
Robert Francis Kennedy was born outside Boston in Brookline, Massachusetts, on November 20, 1925. He was the seventh of nine children to businessman/politician Joseph P. Kennedy Sr. and philanthropist/socialite Rose Fitzgerald Kennedy. His parents were members of two prominent Irish-American families in Boston. His eight siblings were Joseph Jr., John, Rosemary, Kathleen, Eunice, Patricia, Jean, and Ted. All four of his grandparents were children of Irish immigrants.

His father was a wealthy businessman and a leading figure in the Democratic Party. After he stepped down as ambassador to the United Kingdom in 1940, Joe Sr. focused his attention on his oldest son, Joseph Jr., expecting that he would enter politics and be elected president. He also urged the younger children to examine and discuss current events in order to propel them to public service. After Joseph Jr. was killed during World War II, the senior Kennedy's hopes fell on his second son, John, to become president. Joseph Sr. had the money and connections to play a central role in the family's political ambitions.

Kennedy's older brother John was often bedridden by illness and, as a result, became a voracious reader. Although he made little effort to get to know his younger brother during his childhood, John took him on walks and regaled him with the stories of heroes and adventures he had read. One of their favorite authors was John Buchan, who wrote The Thirty-Nine Steps, which influenced both Robert and John. John sometimes called Robert "Black Robert" due to his prudishness and disposition.

Unlike his older brothers, Kennedy took to heart their mother Rose's agenda for everything to have "a purpose," which included visiting historic sites during family outings, visits to the church during morning walks, and games used to expand vocabulary and math skills. He described his position in the family hierarchy by saying, "When you come from that far down, you have to struggle to survive." As the boys were growing up, he tried frequently to get his older brothers' attention, but was seldom successful.

As his father's business success expanded, the family kept homes around Boston and New York City; the Cape Cod peninsula; and Palm Beach. Kennedy later said that during childhood he was "going to different schools, always having to make new friends, and that I was very awkward ... [a]nd I was pretty quiet most of the time. And I didn't mind being alone." He had to repeat third grade. A teacher at Bronxville public school reflected that he was "a regular boy", adding, "It seemed hard for him to finish his work sometimes. But he was only ten after all." He developed an interest in American history, decorating his bedroom with pictures of U.S. presidents and filling his bookshelves with volumes on the American Civil War. He became an avid stamp collector and once received a handwritten letter from Franklin Roosevelt, also a philatelist.

In March 1938, Kennedy sailed to London with his mother and four youngest siblings to join his father, who had begun serving as Ambassador to the United Kingdom. He attended the private Gibbs School for Boys for seventh grade. In April 1939, he gave his first public speech at the placing of a cornerstone for a youth club in England. According to embassy and newspaper reports, his statements were penciled in his own hand and delivered in a "calm and confident" manner. Bobby returned to the United States just before the outbreak of World War II in Europe.

St. Paul's and Portsmouth Priory
In September 1939, Kennedy began eighth grade at St. Paul's School, an elite Protestant private preparatory school for boys in Concord, New Hampshire, that his father favored. Rose Kennedy was unhappy with the school's use of the Protestant Bible. After two months, she took advantage of her ambassador husband's absence from Boston and withdrew Kennedy from St. Paul's. She enrolled him in Portsmouth Priory School, a Benedictine Catholic boarding school for boys in Portsmouth, Rhode Island, which held daily morning and evening prayers and Mass three times a week, with a High Mass on Sundays. Kennedy attended Portsmouth for eighth through tenth grade.

At Portsmouth Priory School, Kennedy was known as "Mrs. Kennedy's little boy Bobby" after he introduced his mother to classmates, who made fun of them. He was defensive of his mother, and on one occasion chased a student out of the dormitory after the boy had commented on her appearance. He befriended Peter MacLellan and wrote to him, when his brother John was serving in the U.S. Navy, that he would be visiting his brother "because he might be killed any minute". Kennedy blamed himself when his grades failed to improve. In letters to her son, Rose urged him to read more and to strengthen his vocabulary. Rose also expressed disappointment and wrote that she did not expect him to let her down. He began developing in other ways, and his brother John noticed his increased physical strength, predicting that the younger Kennedy "would be bouncing me around plenty in two more years". Monks at Portsmouth Priory School regarded him as a moody and indifferent student. Father Damian Kearney, who was two classes behind Kennedy, reflected that he "didn't look happy" and that he did not "smile much". According to Kearney's review of school records, Kennedy was a "poor-to-mediocre student, except for history".

Milton Academy
In September 1942, Kennedy transferred to his third boarding school, Milton Academy, in Milton, Massachusetts, for 11th and 12th grades. His father wanted him to transfer to Milton, believing it would better prepare him for Harvard. At Milton, he met and became friends with David Hackett. He invited Hackett to join him for Sunday Mass. Hackett started accompanying him, and was impressed when Kennedy took it upon himself to fill in for a missing altar boy one Sunday. Hackett admired Kennedy's determination to bypass his shortcomings, and remembered him redoubling his efforts whenever something did not come easy to him, which included athletics, studies, success with girls, and popularity. Hackett remembered the two of them as "misfits", a commonality that drew him to Kennedy, along with an unwillingness to conform to how others acted even if doing so meant not being accepted. Kennedy's grades improved.

One of his first relationships was with a girl named Piedy Bailey. The pair was photographed together when he walked her home after chapel on a Sunday night. Bailey was fond of him and remembered him as being "very appealing". She recalled him being funny, "separate, larky; outside the cliques; private all the time". Soon after he transferred to Milton, he pressed his father to allow him to enlist, as he wanted to catch up to his brothers who were both serving in the military. Kennedy had arrived at Milton unfamiliar with his peers and made little attempt to know the names of his classmates; he called most of the other boys "fella" instead. For this, he was nicknamed "Fella". Most of the school's students had come in eighth or ninth grade and cliques had already been formed. Despite this, his schoolmates would later say the school had no prejudice. He had an early sense of virtue; he disliked dirty jokes and bullying, once stepping in when an upperclassman tried bothering a younger student. The headmaster at Milton would later summarize that he was a "very intelligent boy, quiet and shy, but not outstanding, and he left no special mark on Milton".

Relationship with parents 
In Kennedy's younger years, his father dubbed him the "runt" of the family and wrote him off. Close family friend Lem Billings once remarked to Joe Sr. that he was "the most generous little boy", and Joe Sr. replied that he did not know where his son "got that". Billings commented that the only similarity between Robert and Joe Sr. was their eye color. As Kennedy grew, his father worried that he was soft on others, conflicting with his ideology. In response, Kennedy developed a tough persona that masked his gentle personality, attempting to appease his father. Biographer Judie Mills wrote that Joe Sr.'s lack of interest in Robert was evident by the length of time it took for him to decide to transfer him to Milton Academy. Both Joe Jr. and John attended the exclusive Protestant prep school Choate from their first year, while Robert was already a junior by the time he was enrolled at Milton. Despite his father's disdain, Kennedy continued to seek his approval, requesting that Joe Sr. write him a letter about his opinions on different political events and World War II.

As a child, Kennedy also strove to meet his mother's expectations to become the most dutiful, religious, affectionate, and obedient of the Kennedy children, but the father and son grew distant. Rose found his gentle personality endearing, though this was noted as having made him "invisible to his father". She influenced him heavily and, like her, he became a devout Catholic, throughout his lifetime practicing his religion more seriously than the other boys in the family. He impressed his parents as a child by taking on a newspaper route, seeking their approval and wishing to distinguish himself. However, he had the family chauffeur driving him in a Rolls-Royce so that he could make his deliveries. His mother discovered this and the deliveries ceased.

Joe Sr. was satisfied with Kennedy as an adult, believing him to have become "hard as nails", more like him than any of the other children, while his mother believed he exemplified all she had wanted in a child. Mills wrote, "His parents' conflicting views would be echoed in the opinions of millions of people throughout Bobby's life. Robert Kennedy was a ruthless opportunist who would stop at nothing to attain his ambitions. Robert Kennedy was America's most compassionate public figure, the only person who could save a divided country."

Naval service (1944–1946)

Six weeks before his 18th birthday in 1943, Kennedy enlisted in the United States Naval Reserve as a seaman apprentice. He was released from active duty in March 1944, when he left Milton Academy early to report to the V-12 Navy College Training Program at Harvard College in Cambridge, Massachusetts. His V-12 training began at Harvard (March–November 1944) before he was relocated to Bates College in Lewiston, Maine (November 1944 – June 1945). He returned to Harvard once again in June 1945 completing his post-training requirements in January 1946. At Bates he received a specialized V-12-degree along with 15 others, and during its Winter Carnival built a snow replica of a Navy boat. While in Maine, he wrote a letter to David Hackett in which he expressed feelings of inadequacy and frustration at being isolated from the action. He talked of filling his free time by taking classes with other sailors and remarked that "things are the same as usual up here, and me being my usual moody self I get very sad at times." He added, "If I don't get the hell out of here soon I'll die." In addition to Hackett, who was serving as a paratrooper, more of his Parker Hall dorm mates went overseas and left him behind. With others entering combat before him, Kennedy said this made him "feel more and more like a Draft Dodger  or something". He was also frustrated with the apparent desire to shirk military responsibility by some of the other V-12 students.

Kennedy's brother Joseph P. Kennedy Jr. died in August 1944, when his bomber exploded during a volunteer mission known as Operation Aphrodite. Robert was most affected by his father's reaction to his eldest son's passing. He appeared completely heartbroken and his peer Fred Garfield commented that Kennedy developed depression and questioned his faith for a short time. After his brother's death, Robert gained more attention, moving higher up the family patriarchy. On December 15, 1945, the U.S. Navy commissioned the destroyer , and shortly thereafter granted Kennedy's request to be released from naval-officer training to serve aboard Kennedy starting on February 1, 1946, as a seaman apprentice on the ship's shakedown cruise in the Caribbean. On May 30, 1946, he received his honorable discharge from the Navy. For his service in the Navy, Kennedy was eligible for the American Campaign Medal and the World War II Victory Medal.

Further study, journalism, and marriage (1946–1951)
In September 1946, Kennedy entered Harvard as a junior, having received credit for his time in the V-12 program. He worked hard to make the varsity football team as an end; he was a starter and scored a touchdown in the first game of his senior year before breaking his leg in practice. He earned his varsity letter when his coach sent him in wearing a cast during the last minutes of a game against Yale. His father spoke positively of him when he served as a blocking back and sometime receiver for the faster Dave Hackett. Joseph Sr. attended some of Kennedy's practices and saw his son catch a touchdown pass in an early-season rout of Western Maryland. His teammates admired his physical courage. Despite this, he was a fearless hitter and once tackled a 230-pound fullback head-on. Wally Flynn, another player, looked up in the huddle after one play to see him crying after he broke his leg. He disregarded the injury and kept playing. Kennedy earned two varsity letters over the course of the 1946 and 1947 seasons.

Throughout 1946, Kennedy became active in his brother John's campaign for the U.S. Representative seat that was vacated by James Curley; he joined the campaign full-time after his naval discharge. Biographer Schlesinger wrote that the election served as an entry into politics for both Robert and John. Robert graduated from Harvard in 1948 with a bachelor's degree in political science.

Four of these stories, submitted from Palestine shortly before the end of the British Mandate, provided a first-hand view of the tensions in the land. He was critical of British policy on Palestine and praised the Jewish people he met there calling them "hardy and tough". He held out some hope after seeing Arabs and Jews working side by side but, in the end, feared that the hatred between the groups was too strong and would lead to a war.

In September 1948, he enrolled at the University of Virginia School of Law in Charlottesville. Kennedy adapted to this new environment, being elected president of the Student Legal Forum, where he successfully produced outside speakers including James M. Landis, William O. Douglas, Arthur Krock, and Joseph McCarthy and his family members Joe Sr. and John F. Kennedy. Kennedy's paper on Yalta, written during his senior year, is deposited in the Law Library's Treasure Trove.

On June 17, 1950, Kennedy married Ethel Skakel at St. Mary's Catholic Church in Greenwich, Connecticut. He graduated from law school in June 1951 and flew with Ethel to Greenwich to stay in his father-in-law's guest house. The couple's first child, Kathleen, was born on July 4, 1951.

During this time, his brother John tried to keep Joe Sr. "at arm's length". The brothers rarely interacted until Kenny O'Donnell contacted Robert to repair the relationship between John and their father during John's Senate campaign. As a result of this, Joe Sr. came to view Robert favorably as reliable and "willing to sacrifice himself" for the family.

In September 1951, he went to San Francisco as a correspondent for the Boston Post to cover the convention that concluded the Treaty of Peace with Japan. In October 1951, he embarked on a seven-week Asian trip with his brother John (then a U.S. Congressman from Massachusetts' 11th district) and their sister Patricia to Israel, India, Pakistan, Vietnam, and Japan. Because of their age gap, the two brothers had previously seen little of each other—this  trip came at their father's behest and was the first extended time they had spent together, serving to deepen their relationship. On this trip, the brothers met Liaquat Ali Khan just before his assassination, and India's prime minister, Jawaharlal Nehru.

Senate committee counsel and political campaigns (1951–1960)

JFK Senate campaign and Joseph McCarthy (1952–1955) 
In 1951, Kennedy was admitted to the Massachusetts Bar. That November, he moved with his wife and daughter to a townhouse in the Georgetown neighborhood of Washington, D.C., and started work as a lawyer in the Internal Security Section of the Criminal Division of the U.S. Department of Justice; the section was charged with investigating suspected Soviet agents. In February 1952, he was transferred to Brooklyn (designated as special assistant to attorney general) to help prepare fraud cases against former officials of the Truman administration. On June 6, 1952, he resigned to manage his brother John's U.S. Senate campaign in Massachusetts. JFK's victory was of great importance to the Kennedys, elevating him to national prominence and turning him into a serious potential presidential candidate. John's victory was also equally important to Robert, who felt he had succeeded in eliminating his father's negative perceptions of him.

In December 1952, at his father's behest, Kennedy was appointed by family friend Republican Senator Joseph McCarthy as assistant counsel of the U.S. Senate Permanent Subcommittee on Investigations. Kennedy disapproved of McCarthy's aggressive methods of garnering intelligence on suspected communists. This was a highly visible job for him. He resigned in July 1953, but "retained a fondness for McCarthy". The period of July 1953 to January 1954 saw him at "a professional and personal nadir", feeling that he was adrift while trying to prove himself to his family. Kenneth O'Donnell and Larry O'Brien (who worked on John's congressional campaigns) urged Kennedy to consider running for Massachusetts Attorney General in 1954, but he declined.

After a period as an assistant to his father on the Hoover Commission, Kennedy rejoined the Senate committee staff as chief counsel for the Democratic minority in February 1954. That month, McCarthy's chief counsel Roy Cohn subpoenaed Annie Lee Moss, accusing her of membership in the Communist Party. Kennedy revealed that Cohn had called the wrong Annie Lee Moss and he requested the file on Moss from the FBI. FBI director J. Edgar Hoover had been forewarned by Cohn and denied him access, calling RFK "an arrogant whippersnapper". When Democrats gained a Senate majority in January 1955, Kennedy became chief counsel and was a background figure in the televised Army–McCarthy hearings of 1954 into McCarthy's conduct. The Moss incident turned Cohn into an enemy, which led to Kennedy assisting Democratic senators in ridiculing Cohn during the hearings. The animosity grew to the point where Cohn had to be restrained after asking RFK if he wanted to fight him. For his work on the McCarthy committee, Kennedy was included in a list of Ten Outstanding Young Men of 1954, created by the U.S. Junior Chamber of Commerce. His father had arranged the nomination, his first national award. In 1955 Kennedy was admitted to practice before the United States Supreme Court.

Stevenson aide and focus on organized labor (1956–1960) 

In 1956, Kennedy moved his growing family outside Washington to a house called Hickory Hill, which he purchased from his brother John. Kennedy went on to work as an aide to Adlai Stevenson during the 1956 presidential election which helped him learn how national campaigns worked, in preparation for a future run by his brother, Jack. Unimpressed with Stevenson, he reportedly voted for incumbent Dwight D. Eisenhower. Kennedy was also a delegate at the 1956 Democratic National Convention, having replaced Tip O'Neil at the request of his brother John, joining in what was ultimately an unsuccessful effort to help JFK get the vice-presidential nomination. Shortly after this, following instructions by his father, Kennedy tried making amends with J. Edgar Hoover. There seemed to be some improvement in their interactions, which came to be seen as "elemental political necessity" by Kennedy. This later changed after Kennedy was appointed attorney general, where Hoover saw him as an "unprecedented threat".

From 1957 to 1959, he made a name for himself while serving as the chief counsel to the U.S. Senate's McClellan Committee under chairman John L. McClellan. Kennedy was given authority over testimony scheduling, areas of investigation, and witness questioning by McClellan, a move that was made by the chairman to limit attention to himself and allow outrage by organized labor to be directed toward Kennedy. In a famous scene, Kennedy squared off with Teamsters Union President Jimmy Hoffa during the antagonistic argument that marked Hoffa's testimony. Kennedy, who was instructed to collect information, discovered several financial irregularities, such as that Hoffa had misappropriated $9.5 million in union funds and made corrupt deals with employers. During the hearings, Kennedy received criticism from liberal critics and other commentators both for his outburst of impassioned anger and doubts about the innocence of those who invoked the Fifth Amendment. Senators Barry Goldwater and Karl Mundt wrote to each other and complained about "the Kennedy boys" having hijacked the McClellan Committee by their focus on Hoffa and the Teamsters. They believed Kennedy covered for Walter Reuther and the United Automobile Workers, a union which typically would back Democratic office seekers. Amidst the allegations, Kennedy wrote in his journal that the two senators had "no guts" as they never addressed him directly, only through the press. He left the committee in late 1959 in order to run his brother's presidential campaign.

JFK presidential campaign (1960) 

In 1960, Kennedy published The Enemy Within, a book which described the corrupt practices within the Teamsters and other unions that he had helped investigate. John Seigenthaler assisted Kennedy. Kennedy went to work on the presidential campaign of his brother, John. In contrast to his role in his brother's previous campaign eight years prior, Kennedy gave stump speeches throughout the primary season, gaining confidence as time went on. His strategy "to win at any cost" led him to call on Franklin D. Roosevelt Jr. to attack Hubert Humphrey as a draft dodger; Roosevelt eventually did make the statement that Humphrey avoided service.

Concerned that John Kennedy was going to receive the Democratic Party's nomination, some supporters of Lyndon Johnson, who was also running for the nomination, revealed to the press that JFK had Addison's disease, saying that he required life-sustaining cortisone treatments. Though in fact a diagnosis had been made, Kennedy tried to protect his brother by denying the allegation, saying that JFK had never had "an ailment described classically as Addison's disease". After securing the nomination, John Kennedy nonetheless decided to offer Lyndon Johnson the vice presidency. This did not sit well with some Kennedy supporters, and Robert tried unsuccessfully to convince Johnson to turn down the offer, leading him to view Robert with contempt afterward. RFK had already disliked Johnson prior to the presidential campaign, seeing him as a threat to his brother's ambitions. RFK wanted his brother to choose labor leader Walter Reuther. Despite Kennedy's attempts, Johnson became his brother's running mate.

Kennedy worked toward downplaying his brother's Catholic faith during the primary but took a more aggressive and supportive stance during the general election. These concerns were mostly calmed after JFK delivered a speech in September in Houston where he said that he was in favor of the separation of church and state. The following month, Kennedy was involved in securing the release of civil rights leader Martin Luther King Jr. from a jail in Atlanta. Kennedy spoke with Georgia governor Ernest Vandiver and later Judge Oscar Mitchell, after the judge had sentenced King for violating his probation when he protested at a whites-only snack bar.

Attorney General of the United States (1961–1964)

After winning the 1960 presidential election, President-elect John F. Kennedy appointed his younger brother attorney general. The choice was controversial, with publications including The New York Times and The New Republic calling him inexperienced and unqualified. He had no experience in any state or federal court, causing the president to joke, "I can't see that it's wrong to give him a little legal experience before he goes out to practice law." But Kennedy was hardly a novice as a lawyer, having gained significant experience conducting investigations and questioning witnesses as a Justice Department attorney and Senate committee counsel and staff director.

According to Bobby Baker, the Senate majority secretary and a protégé of Lyndon Johnson, President-elect Kennedy did not want to name his brother attorney general, but their father overruled him. At the behest of Vice President-elect Johnson, Baker persuaded the influential Southern senator Richard Russell to allow a voice vote to confirm the president's brother in January 1961, as Kennedy "would have been lucky to get 40 votes" on a roll-call vote.

The deputy and assistant attorneys general Kennedy chose included Byron White and Nicholas Katzenbach. Kennedy also played a major role in helping his brother form his cabinet. John Kennedy wanted to name Senator J. William Fulbright, whom he knew and liked, as his secretary of state. Fulbright was generally regarded as the Senate's resident foreign policy expert, but he also supported segregation and white supremacy in the South. Robert Kennedy persuaded his brother that having Fulbright as secretary of state would cost the Democrats Afro-American votes, leading to Dean Rusk being nominated instead after John Kennedy decided that his next choice, McGeorge Bundy, was too young. Kennedy was also present at the job interview when the CEO of the Ford Motor Company, Robert McNamara, was interviewed by John Kennedy about becoming defense secretary. McNamara's self-confidence and belief that he could "scientifically" solve any problem via his "Systems Analysis" style of management impressed the Kennedy brothers, though John was rattled for a moment when McNamara asked if his bestselling book Profiles in Courage was written by a ghost writer.      

Author James W. Hilty concludes that Kennedy "played an unusual combination of roles—campaign director, attorney general, executive overseer, controller of patronage, chief adviser, and brother protector" and that nobody before him had had such power. His tenure as attorney general was easily the period of greatest power for the office—no previous United States attorney general had enjoyed such clear influence on all areas of policy during an administration. To a great extent, President Kennedy sought the advice and counsel of his younger brother, with Robert being the president's closest political adviser. He was relied upon as both the president's primary source of administrative information and as a general counsel with whom trust was implicit. He exercised widespread authority over every cabinet department, leading the Associated Press to dub him "Bobby—Washington's No. 2-man".

The president once remarked about his brother, "If I want something done and done immediately I rely on the Attorney General. He is very much the doer in this administration, and has an organizational gift I have rarely if ever seen surpassed."

Berlin
As one of the president's closest White House advisers, Kennedy played a crucial role in the events surrounding the Berlin Crisis of 1961. Operating mainly through a private, backchannel connection to Soviet spy Georgi Bolshakov, he relayed important diplomatic communications between the American and Soviet governments. Most significantly, this connection helped the U.S. set up the Vienna Summit in June 1961, and later to defuse the tank standoff with the Soviets at Berlin's Checkpoint Charlie in October. Kennedy's visit with his wife to West Berlin in February 1962 demonstrated U.S. support for the city and helped repair the strained relationship between the administration and its special envoy in Berlin, Lucius D. Clay.

Organized crime and the Teamsters

As attorney general, Kennedy pursued a relentless crusade against organized crime and the Mafia, sometimes disagreeing on strategy with FBI Director J. Edgar Hoover. Convictions against organized crime figures rose by 800 percent during his term. Kennedy worked to shift Hoover's focus away from communism, which Hoover saw as a more serious threat, to organized crime. According to James Neff, Kennedy's success in this endeavor was due to his brother's position, giving the attorney general leverage over Hoover. Biographer Richard Hack concluded that Hoover's dislike for Kennedy came from his being unable to control him.

He was relentless in his pursuit of Teamsters Union president Jimmy Hoffa, due to Hoffa's known corruption in financial and electoral matters, both personally and organizationally, creating a so-called "Get Hoffa" squad of prosecutors and investigators. The enmity between the two men was intense, with accusations of a personal vendetta—what Hoffa called a "blood feud"—exchanged between them. On July 7, 1961, after Hoffa was reelected to the Teamsters presidency, RFK told reporters the government's case against Hoffa had not been changed by what he called "a small group of teamsters" supporting him. The following year, it was leaked that Hoffa had claimed to a Teamster local that Kennedy had been "bodily" removed from his office, the statement being confirmed by a Teamster press agent and Hoffa saying Kennedy had only been ejected. 
On March 4, 1964, Hoffa was convicted in Chattanooga, Tennessee, of attempted bribery of a grand juror during his 1962 conspiracy trial in Nashville, Tennessee, and sentenced to eight years in prison and a $10,000 fine. After learning of Hoffa's conviction by telephone, Kennedy issued congratulatory messages to the three prosecutors. While on bail during his appeal, Hoffa was convicted in a second trial held in Chicago, on July 26, 1964, on one count of conspiracy and three counts of mail and wire fraud for improper use of the Teamsters' pension fund, and sentenced to five years in prison. Hoffa spent the next three years unsuccessfully appealing his 1964 convictions, and began serving his aggregate prison sentence of 13 years (eight years for bribery, five years for fraud) on March 7, 1967, at the Lewisburg Federal Penitentiary in Pennsylvania.

Civil rights
Kennedy expressed the administration's commitment to civil rights during a 1961 speech at the University of Georgia Law School:

FBI Director J. Edgar Hoover viewed civil rights leader Martin Luther King Jr. as an upstart troublemaker, calling him an "enemy of the state". In February 1962 Hoover presented Kennedy with allegations that some of King's close confidants and advisers were communists. Concerned about the allegations, the FBI deployed agents to monitor King in the following months. Kennedy warned King to discontinue the suspected associations. In response, King agreed to ask suspected communist Jack O'Dell to resign from the Southern Christian Leadership Conference (SCLP), but he refused to heed to the request to ask Stanley Levison, whom he regarded as a trusted advisor, to resign. In October 1963, Kennedy issued a written directive authorizing the FBI to wiretap King and other leaders of the SCLP, King's civil rights organization. Although Kennedy only gave written approval for limited wiretapping of King's phones "on a trial basis, for a month or so", Hoover extended the clearance so that his men were "unshackled" to look for evidence in any areas of King's life they deemed worthy. The wiretapping continued through June 1966 and was revealed in 1968, days before Kennedy's death.

Kennedy remained committed to civil rights enforcement to such a degree that he commented in 1962 that it seemed to envelop almost every area of his public and private life, from prosecuting corrupt Southern electoral officials to answering late-night calls from Coretta Scott King about her husband's imprisonment for demonstrations in Alabama. During his tenure as attorney general, he undertook the most energetic and persistent desegregation of the administration that Capitol Hill had ever experienced. He demanded that every area of government begin recruiting realistic levels of black and other nonwhite workers, going so far as to criticize Vice President Johnson for his failure to desegregate his own office staff. Relations between the Kennedys and civil-rights activists could be tense, partly due to the administration's decision that a number of complaints King filed with the Justice Department between 1961 and 1963 be handled "through negotiation between the city commission and Negro citizens".

Although it has become commonplace to assert the phrase "The Kennedy Administration" or "President Kennedy" when discussing the legislative and executive support of the civil rights movement, between 1960 and 1963 a great many of the initiatives were the result of the passion and determination of an emboldened Robert Kennedy, who through his rapid education in the realities of Southern racism underwent a thorough conversion of purpose as attorney general. Asked in May 1962, "What do you see as the big problem ahead for you, is it crime or internal security?" Kennedy replied, "Civil rights." The president came to share his brother's sense of urgency on the matters at hand to such an extent that it was at the attorney general's insistence that he made his famous "Report to the American People on Civil Rights".

Kennedy played a large role in the response to the Freedom Riders protests. He acted after the Anniston bus bombing to protect the Riders in continuing their journey, sending John Seigenthaler, his administrative assistant, to Alabama to attempt to secure the Riders' safety there. Despite a work rule that allowed a driver to decline an assignment he regarded as potentially unsafe, he persuaded a manager of The Greyhound Corporation to obtain a coach operator who was willing to drive a special bus for the continuance of the Freedom Ride from Birmingham to Montgomery, on the circuitous journey to Jackson, Mississippi. Later, during the attack and burning by a white mob of the First Baptist Church in Montgomery, which King and 1,500 sympathizers attended, the attorney general telephoned King to ask for his assurance that they would not leave the building until the U.S. Marshals and National Guard he sent had secured the area. King proceeded to berate Kennedy for "allowing the situation to continue". King later publicly thanked him for dispatching the forces to break up the attack that might otherwise have ended his life. Kennedy then negotiated the safe passage of the Freedom Riders from the First Baptist Church to Jackson, where they were arrested. He offered to bail the Freedom Riders out of jail, but they refused, which upset him.

Kennedy's attempts to end the Freedom Rides early were tied to an upcoming summit with Nikita Khrushchev and Charles de Gaulle. He believed the continued international publicity of race riots would tarnish the president heading into international negotiations. This attempt to curtail the Freedom Rides alienated many civil rights leaders who, at the time, perceived him as intolerant and narrow-minded. In an attempt to better understand and improve race relations, Kennedy held a private meeting in New York City in May 1963 with a black delegation coordinated by prominent author James Baldwin. Earlier in September 1962, Kennedy sent a force of U.S. marshals and deputized U.S. Border Patrol agents and federal prison guards to Oxford, Mississippi, to enforce a federal court order allowing the admittance of the first African-American student, James Meredith, to the University of Mississippi. The attorney general had hoped that legal means, along with the escort of federal officers, would be enough to force Governor Ross Barnett to allow Meredith's admission. He also was very concerned there might be a "mini-civil war" between federal troops and armed protesters. President Kennedy reluctantly sent federal troops after the situation on campus turned violent.

The ensuing Ole Miss riot of 1962 resulted in 300 injuries and two deaths, but Kennedy remained adamant that black students had the right to enjoy the benefits of all levels of the educational system. The Office of Civil Rights also hired its first African-American lawyer and began to work cautiously with leaders of the Civil Rights Movement. Kennedy saw voting as the key to racial justice and collaborated with Presidents Kennedy and Johnson to create the landmark Civil Rights Act of 1964, which helped bring an end to Jim Crow laws. Between December 1961 and December 1963, Kennedy also expanded the United States Department of Justice Civil Rights Division by 60 percent.

U.S. Steel
At the president's direction, Kennedy used the power of federal agencies to influence U.S. Steel not to institute a price increase. The Wall Street Journal wrote that the administration had set prices of steel "by naked power, by threats, by agents of the state security police." Yale law professor Charles Reich wrote in The New Republic that the Justice Department had violated civil liberties by calling a federal grand jury to indict U.S. Steel so quickly, then disbanding it after the price increase did not occur.

Death penalty issues
During the Kennedy administration, the federal government carried out its last pre-Furman federal execution (of Victor Feguer in Iowa, 1963), and Kennedy, as attorney general, represented the government in this case.

In 1967 Kennedy expressed his strong willingness to support a bill then under consideration for the abolition of the death penalty.

Cuba
As his brother's confidant, Kennedy oversaw the CIA's anti-Castro activities after the failed Bay of Pigs Invasion. He also helped develop the strategy during the Cuban Missile Crisis to blockade Cuba instead of initiating a military strike that might have led to nuclear war. He had initially been among the more hawkish members of the administration on matters concerning Cuban insurrectionist aid. His initial strong support for covert actions in Cuba soon changed to a position of removal from further involvement once he became aware of the CIA's tendency to draw out initiatives, and provide itself with almost unchecked authority in matters of foreign covert operations.

Allegations that the Kennedys knew of plans by the CIA to kill Fidel Castro, or approved of such plans, have been debated by historians over the years. JFK's friend and associate, historian Arthur M. Schlesinger Jr., for example, expressed the opinion that operatives linked to the CIA were among the most reckless individuals to have operated during the period—providing themselves with unscrutinized freedoms to threaten the lives of Castro and other members of the Cuban revolutionary government regardless of the legislative apparatus in Washington—freedoms that, unbeknownst to those at the White House attempting to prevent a nuclear war, placed the entire U.S.–Soviet relationship in perilous danger.

The "Family Jewels" documents, declassified by the CIA in 2007, suggest that before the Bay of Pigs Invasion, the attorney general personally authorized one such assassination attempt. But there is ample evidence to the contrary, such as that Kennedy was informed of an earlier plot involving the CIA's use of Mafia bosses Santo Trafficante Jr. and John Roselli only during a briefing on May 7, 1962, and in fact directed the CIA to halt any existing efforts directed at Castro's assassination. Concurrently, Kennedy served as the president's personal representative in Operation Mongoose, the post-Bay of Pigs covert operations program the president established in November 1961. Mongoose was meant to incite revolution in Cuba that would result in Castro's downfall, not his assassination.

During the Cuban Missile Crisis, Kennedy proved himself to be a gifted politician with an ability to obtain compromises, tempering aggressive positions of key figures in the hawk camp. The trust the president placed in him on matters of negotiation was such that his role in the crisis is today seen as having been of vital importance in securing a blockade, which averted a full military engagement between the United States and the USSR. His clandestine meetings with members of the Soviet government continued to provide a key link to Khrushchev during even the darkest moments of the crisis, when the threat of nuclear strikes was considered very real. On the last night of the crisis, President Kennedy was so grateful for his brother's work in averting nuclear war that he summed it up by saying, "Thank God for Bobby."

Japan

At a summit meeting with Japanese prime minister Hayato Ikeda in Washington D.C. in 1961, President Kennedy promised to make a reciprocal visit to Japan in 1962, but the decision to resume atmospheric nuclear testing forced him to postpone such a visit, and he sent Bobby in his stead. Kennedy and his wife Ethel arrived in Tokyo in February 1962 at a very sensitive time in U.S.-Japan relations, shortly after the massive Anpo protests against the U.S.-Japan Security Treaty had highlighted anti-American grievances. Kennedy won over a highly skeptical Japanese public and press with his cheerful, open demeanor, sincerity, and youthful energy. Most famously, Kennedy scored a public relations coup during a nationally televised speech at Waseda University in Tokyo. When radical Marxist student activists from Zengakuren attempted to shout him down, he calmly invited one of them on stage and engaged the student in an impromptu debate. Kennedy's calmness under fire and willingness to take the student's questions seriously won many admirers in Japan and praise from the Japanese media, both for himself and on his brother's behalf.

Assassination of John F. Kennedy 

At the time that President Kennedy was assassinated in Dallas on November 22, 1963, RFK was at home with aides from the Justice Department. J. Edgar Hoover called and told him his brother had been shot. Hoover then hung up before he could ask any questions. Kennedy later said he thought Hoover had enjoyed telling him the news. Kennedy then received a call from Tazewell Shepard, a naval aide to the president, who told him that his brother was dead. Shortly after the call from Hoover, Kennedy phoned McGeorge Bundy at the White House, instructing him to change the locks on the president's files. He ordered the Secret Service to dismantle the Oval Office and cabinet room's secret taping systems. He scheduled a meeting with CIA director John McCone and asked if the CIA had any involvement in his brother's death. McCone denied it, with Kennedy later telling investigator Walter Sheridan that he asked the director "in a way that he couldn't lie to me, and they [the CIA] hadn't".

An hour after the president was shot, Bobby Kennedy received a phone call from Vice President Johnson before Johnson boarded Air Force One. RFK remembered their conversation starting with Johnson demonstrating sympathy before the vice president stated his belief that he should be sworn in immediately; RFK opposed the idea since he felt "it would be nice" for President Kennedy's body to return to Washington with the deceased president still being the incumbent. Eventually, the two concluded that the best course of action would be for Johnson to take the oath of office before returning to Washington. In his 1971 book We Band of Brothers, aide Edwin O. Guthman recounted Kennedy admitting to him an hour after receiving word of his brother's death that he thought he would be the one "they would get" as opposed to his brother. In the days following the assassination, he wrote letters to his two eldest children, Kathleen and Joseph, saying that as the oldest Kennedy family members of their generation, they had a special responsibility to remember what their uncle had started and to love and serve their country. He was originally opposed to Jacqueline Kennedy's decision to have a closed casket, as he wanted the funeral to keep with tradition, but he changed his mind after seeing the cosmetic, waxen remains.

Kennedy was asked by Democratic Party leaders to introduce a film about his late brother at the 1964 party convention. When he was introduced, the crowd, including party bosses, elected officials, and delegates, applauded thunderously and tearfully for a full 22 minutes before they would let him speak. He was close to breaking down before he spoke about his brother's vision for both the party and the nation and recited a quote from Shakespeare's Romeo and Juliet (3.2) that Jacqueline had given him:

The ten-month investigation by the Warren Commission of 1963–1964 concluded that the president had been assassinated by Lee Harvey Oswald and that Oswald had acted alone. On September 27, 1964, Kennedy issued a statement through his New York campaign office: "As I said in Poland last summer, I am convinced Oswald was solely responsible for what happened and that he did not have any outside help or assistance. He was a malcontent who could not get along here or in the Soviet Union." He added, "I have not read the report, nor do I intend to. But I have been briefed on it and I am completely satisfied that the Commission investigated every lead and examined every piece of evidence. The Commission's inquiry was thorough and conscientious." After a meeting with Kennedy in 1966, Arthur M. Schlesinger Jr. wrote: "It is evident that he believes that [the Warren Commission's report] was a poor job and will not endorse it, but that he is unwilling to criticize it and thereby reopen the whole tragic business." Jerry Bruno, an "advance man" for JFK who also worked on RFK's 1968 presidential campaign, would later state in 1993: "I talked to Robert Kennedy many times about the Warren Commission, and he never doubted their result." In a 2013 interview with CBS journalist Charlie Rose, son Robert F. Kennedy Jr. stated that his father was "fairly convinced" that others besides Oswald were involved in his brother's assassination and that he privately believed the Commission's report was a "shoddy piece of craftsmanship".

The killing was judged as having a profound impact on Kennedy. Beran assesses the assassination as having moved Kennedy away from reliance on the political system and to become more questioning. Tye views Kennedy following the death of his brother as "more fatalistic, having seen how fast he could lose what he cherished the most."

Vice presidential candidate 

In the wake of the assassination of his brother and Lyndon Johnson's ascension to the presidency, with the office of vice president now vacant, Kennedy was viewed favorably as a potential candidate for the position in the 1964 presidential election. Several Kennedy partisans called for him to be drafted in tribute to his brother; national polling showed that three of four Democrats were in favor of him as Johnson's running mate. Democratic organizers supported him as a write-in candidate in the New Hampshire primary and 25,000 Democrats wrote in Kennedy's name in March 1964, only 3,700 fewer than the number of Democrats who wrote in Johnson's name as their pick for president.

Kennedy discussed the vice presidency with Arthur Schlesinger. Schlesinger thought that he should develop his own political base first, and Kennedy observed that the job "was really based on waiting around for someone to die". In his first interview after the assassination Kennedy said he was not considering the vice presidency. During this time he said of the coalescing Johnson administration, "It's too early for me to even think about '64, because I don't know whether I want to have any part of these people. ...If they don't fulfill and follow out my brother's program, I don't want to have anything to do with them." But in January 1964 Kennedy began low-key inquiries as to the vice-presidential position and by the summer was developing plans to help Johnson in cities and in the Northeast based on JFK's 1960 campaign strategies.

Despite the fanfare within the Democratic Party, Johnson was not inclined to have Kennedy on his ticket. The two disliked one another intensely, with feelings often described as "mutual contempt" that went back to their first meeting in 1953, and had only intensified during JFK's presidency. At the time, Johnson privately said of Kennedy, "I don't need that little runt to win", while Kennedy privately said of Johnson that he was "mean, bitter, vicious—an animal in many ways". To block Kennedy, Johnson considered nominating his brother-in-law Sargent Shriver for vice president, but the Kennedy family vetoed that. Kenny O'Donnell, a Kennedy aide who stayed on to serve Johnson, told the president that if he wanted a Catholic vice president, the only candidate available was Kennedy. Johnson instead chose Senator Hubert Humphrey.

During a post-presidency interview with historian Doris Kearns Goodwin, Johnson claimed that Kennedy "acted like he was the custodian of the Kennedy dream" despite Johnson being seen as this after JFK was assassinated, arguing that he had "waited" his turn and Kennedy should have done the same. Johnson recalled a "tidal wave of letters and memos about how great a vice president Bobby would be", but felt he could not "let it happen" as he viewed the possibility of Kennedy on the ticket as ensuring that he would never know if he could be elected "on my own". On July 27, 1964, Kennedy was summoned to the White House and told by Johnson that he did not want him as his running mate, leading the former to say "I could have helped you". Johnson wanted Kennedy to tell the media that he decided to withdraw his name, but he refused, saying the president could do that himself. Johnson wanted a way to announce that he had refused Kennedy serving as his running mate without appearing to be motivated by malice towards a man he disliked and distrusted. The Democratic power broker Clark Clifford suggested to Johnson a way to block Kennedy. At a meeting in the Oval Office that, unknown to him, was being recorded, Clifford said: "Why don't you reach a policy decision that, after careful consideration, you've decided that you're not going to select anyone from your cabinet?" When Johnson replied "That's pretty thin, isn't it?", leading Clifford to answer, "Well, it is pretty thin, but it's a lot better than nothing".

In July 1964, Johnson issued an official statement ruling out all of his current cabinet members as potential running mates, judging them to be "so valuable ... in their current posts". In response to this statement, angry letters poured in directed towards both Johnson and his wife, Lady Bird, expressing disappointment at Kennedy being dropped from the field of potential running mates. Johnson, worried that delegates at the convention would draft Kennedy onto the ticket, ordered the FBI to monitor Kennedy's contacts and actions, and to make sure that he could not speak until after Hubert Humphrey was confirmed as his running mate. After making his announcement, Johnson at an "off-the-record" meeting in the Oval Office with three journalists boasted about how he had gotten "that damned albatross off his neck" as he proceeded to mock what he called Kennedy's "funny" voice and mannerisms. Though not published in the newspapers, Kennedy quickly learned of Johnson's performance and demanded an apology, only to have the president deny the story. After hearing Johnson's denial, Kennedy wrote: "He tells so many lies that he convinces himself after a while he's telling the truth. He just doesn't recognize truth or falsehood".

In a meeting with Secretary of State Dean Rusk, Johnson talked about Kennedy. Both felt that Kennedy was "freakish ambitious" with Rusk saying: "Mr. President, I just can't wrap my mind around that kind of ambition. I don't know how to understand it". Both were afraid that Kennedy might use the nostalgia for his assassinated brother to "stampede" the Democratic National Convention delegates to nominate him, and were hoping that Kennedy might run for Senate in New York, though Rusk was also worried that a Senate run would serve as "a drag on your own position in New York state". Furthermore, white Southerners tended to vote Democratic as a bloc at the time, and a poll in 1964 showed that 33% of Southerners would not vote Democratic if Kennedy were Johnson's running mate, causing many Democratic leaders to oppose Kennedy serving as vice president, lest it alienate one of the most solid and reliable blocs of Democratic voters.

At the DNC, Kennedy appeared on the stage to introduce a film honoring his late brother, A Thousand Days, causing the convention hall to explode with cheers for 22 minutes despite Kennedy's gestures indicating that he wanted the crowd to fall silent so he could began his speech. Senator Henry Jackson advised Kennedy, "Let them get it out of their system" as he stood on the stage raising his hand to signal he wanted the crowd to stop cheering. When the crowd finally stopped cheering, Kennedy gave his speech, which ended with a quotation from Romeo and Juliet: "When he shall die, take him and cut him out in little stars, And he will make the face of heaven so fine, That all the world shall be in love with night, and pay no worship to the garish sun". Johnson knew instantly that the reference to the "garish sun" was to him.

U.S. Senate (1965–1968)

1964 election 

Nine months after his brother's assassination, Kennedy left the cabinet to run for a seat in the U.S. Senate representing New York, announcing his candidacy on August 25, 1964, two days before the end of that year's Democratic National Convention. He had considered the possibility of running for the seat since early spring, but also giving consideration for governor of Massachusetts or, as he put it, "go away", leaving politics altogether after the plane crash and injury of his brother Ted in June, two months earlier. Positive reception in Europe convinced him to remain in politics. Kennedy was lauded during trips to Germany and Poland, the denizens of the latter country's greetings to Kennedy being interpreted by Leaming as evaporating the agony he had sustained since his brother's passing. Kennedy was given permission to run by the New York State Democratic Committee on September 1, amid mixed feelings in regards to his candidacy.
Despite their notoriously difficult relationship, Johnson gave considerable support to Kennedy's campaign.

His opponent was Republican incumbent Kenneth Keating, who attempted to portray Kennedy as an arrogant carpetbagger since he did not reside in the state. The New York Times editorialized, "there is nothing illegal about the possible nomination of Robert F. Kennedy of Massachusetts as Senator from New York, but there is plenty of cynical about it, ... merely choosing the state as a convenient launching‐pad for the political ambitions of himself." The main reason Kennedy chose not to run for the U.S. Senate from his native Massachusetts was that his younger brother Ted was running for reelection. RFK charged Keating with having "not done much of anything constructive" despite his presence in Congress during a September 8 press conference. Kennedy won the November election, helped in part by Johnson's huge victory margin in New York.

Tenure
Kennedy drew attention in Congress early on as the brother of President Kennedy, which set him apart from other senators. He drew more than 50 senators as spectators when he delivered a speech in the Senate on nuclear proliferation in June 1965. But he also saw a decline in his power, going from the president's most trusted advisor to one of a hundred senators, and his impatience with collaborative lawmaking showed. Though fellow senator Fred R. Harris expected not to like Kennedy, the two became allies; Harris even called them "each other's best friends in the Senate". Kennedy's younger brother Ted was his senior there. Robert saw his brother as a guide on managing within the Senate, and the arrangement worked to deepen their relationship. Harris noted that Kennedy was intense about matters and issues that concerned him. Kennedy gained a reputation in the Senate for being well prepared for debate, but his tendency to speak to other senators in a more "blunt" fashion caused him to be "unpopular ... with many of his colleagues".

While serving in the Senate, Kennedy advocated gun control. In May 1965 he co-sponsored S.1592, proposed by President Johnson and sponsored by Senator Thomas J. Dodd, that would put federal restrictions on mail-order gun sales. Speaking in support of the bill, Kennedy said, "For too long we dealt with these deadly weapons as if they were harmless toys. Yet their very presence, the ease of their acquisition and the familiarity of their appearance have led to thousands of deaths each year. With the passage of this bill we will begin to meet our responsibilities. It would save hundreds of thousands of lives in this country and spare thousands of families ... grief and heartache. ... " In remarks during a May 1968 campaign stop in Roseburg, Oregon, Kennedy defended the bill as keeping firearms away from "people who have no business with guns or rifles". The bill forbade "mail order sale of guns to the very young, those with criminal records and the insane," according to The Oregonian'''s report. S.1592 and subsequent bills, and the assassinations of Martin Luther King Jr. and Robert F. Kennedy, paved the way for the eventual passage of the Gun Control Act of 1968.

Kennedy and his staff had employed a cautionary "amendments–only" strategy for his first year in the senate. In 1966 and 1967 they took more direct legislative action, but were met with increasing resistance from the Johnson administration. Despite perceptions that the two were hostile in their respective offices to each other, U.S. News reported Kennedy's support of the Johnson administration's "Great Society" program through his voting record. Kennedy supported both major and minor parts of the program, and each year over 60% of his roll call votes were consistently in favor of Johnson's policies.

On February 8, 1966, Kennedy urged the United States to pledge that it would not be the first country to use nuclear weapons against countries that did not have them noting that China had made the pledge and the Soviet Union indicated it was also willing to do so.

In June 1966, he visited apartheid-era South Africa accompanied by his wife, Ethel, and a few aides. The tour was greeted with international praise at a time when few politicians dared to entangle themselves in the politics of South Africa. He spoke out against the oppression of the native population, and was welcomed by the black population as though he were a visiting head of state. In an interview with Look magazine he said:

 
At the University of Cape Town he delivered the annual Day of Affirmation Address. A quote from this address appears on his memorial at Arlington National Cemetery: "Each time a man stands up for an ideal, or acts to improve the lot of others, or strikes out against injustice, he sends forth a tiny ripple of hope."

On January 28, 1967, Kennedy began a ten-day stay in Europe, meeting Harold Wilson in London who advised him to tell President Johnson about his belief that the ongoing Vietnam conflict was wrong. Upon returning to the U.S. in early February, he was confronted by the press who asked him if his conversations abroad had negatively impacted American foreign relations.

During his years as a senator, he helped to start a successful redevelopment project in poverty-stricken Bedford–Stuyvesant, Brooklyn. Schlesinger wrote that Kennedy had hoped Bedford-Stuyvesant would become an example of self-imposed growth for other impoverished neighborhoods. Kennedy had difficulty securing support from President Johnson, whose administration was charged by Kennedy as having opposed a "special impact" program meant to bring about the federal progress that he had supported. Robert B. Semple Jr. repeated similar sentiments in September 1967, writing the Johnson administration was preparing "a concentrated attack" on Robert F. Kennedy's proposal that Semple claimed would "build more and better low-cost housing in the slums through private enterprise." Kennedy confided to journalist Jack Newfield that while he tried collaborating with the administration through courting its members and compromising with the bill, "They didn't even try to work something out together. To them it's all just politics."

He also visited the Mississippi Delta as a member of the Senate committee reviewing the effectiveness of "War on Poverty" programs, particularly that of the Economic Opportunity Act of 1964. Marian Wright Edelman described Kennedy as "deeply moved and outraged" by the sight of the starving children living in the economically abysmal climate, changing her impression of him from "tough, arrogant, and politically driven." Edelman noted further that the senator requested she call on Martin Luther King Jr. to bring the impoverished to Washington, D.C., to make them more visible, leading to the creation of the Poor People's Campaign. Kennedy sought to remedy the problems of poverty through legislation to encourage private industry to locate in poverty-stricken areas, thus creating jobs for the unemployed, and stressed the importance of work over welfare.

Kennedy worked on the Senate Labor Committee at the time of the workers' rights activism of Cesar Chavez, Dolores Huerta, and the National Farm Workers Association (NFWA). At the request of labor leader Walter Reuther, who had previously marched with and provided money to Chavez, Kennedy flew out to Delano, California, to investigate the situation. Although little attention was paid to the first two committee hearings in March 1966 for legislation to include farm workers by an amendment of the National Labor Relations Act, Kennedy's attendance at the third hearing brought media coverage. Biographer Thomas wrote that Kennedy was moved after seeing the conditions of the workers, who he deemed were being taken advantage of. Chavez stressed to Kennedy that migrant workers needed to be recognized as human beings. Kennedy later engaged in an exchange with Kern County sheriff Leroy Galyen where he criticized the sheriff's deputies for taking photographs of "people on picket lines."

As a senator, he was popular among African Americans and other minorities including Native Americans and immigrant groups. He spoke forcefully in favor of what he called the "disaffected", the impoverished, and "the excluded", thereby aligning himself with leaders of the civil rights struggle and social justice campaigners, leading the Democratic party in pursuit of a more aggressive agenda to eliminate perceived discrimination on all levels. He supported desegregation busing, integration of all public facilities, the Voting Rights Act of 1965, and anti-poverty social programs to increase education, offer opportunities for employment, and provide health care for African Americans. Consistent with President Kennedy's Alliance for Progress, he also placed increasing emphasis on human rights as a central focus of U.S. foreign policy.

Vietnam
The JFK administration had backed U.S. involvement in Southeast Asia and other parts of the world in the frame of the Cold War, but Kennedy was not known to be involved in discussions on the Vietnam War when he was his brother's attorney general.Hilty, p. 460. According to historian Doris Kearns Goodwin, before choosing to run for the Senate, Kennedy had sought an ambassadorship to South Vietnam. Entering the Senate, Kennedy initially kept private his disagreements with President Johnson on the war. While Kennedy vigorously supported his brother's earlier efforts, he never publicly advocated commitment of ground troops. Though bothered by the beginning of the bombing of North Vietnam in February 1965, Kennedy did not wish to appear antagonistic toward the president's agenda. But by April, Kennedy was advocating a halt to the bombing to Johnson, who acknowledged that Kennedy played a part in influencing his choice to temporarily cease bombing the following month. Kennedy cautioned Johnson against sending combat troops as early as 1965, but Johnson chose instead to follow the recommendation of the rest of his predecessor's still intact staff of advisers. In July, after Johnson made a large commitment of American ground forces to Vietnam, Kennedy made multiple calls for a settlement through negotiation. The next month, John Paul Vann, a lieutenant colonel in the U.S. Army, wrote that Kennedy "indicat[ed] comprehension of the problems we face", in a letter to the senator. In December 1965, Kennedy advised his friend, the Defense Secretary Robert McNamara, that he should counsel Johnson to declare a ceasefire in Vietnam, a bombing pause over North Vietnam, and to take up an offer by Algeria to serve as a "honest broker" in peace talks. The left-wing Algerian government had friendly relations with North Vietnam and the National Liberation Front and had indicated in 1965-1966 that it was willing to serve as a conduit for peace talks, but most of Johnson's advisers were leery of the Algerian offer.

On January 31, 1966, Kennedy in a speech on the Senate floor stated: "If we regard bombing as the answer in Vietnam, we are headed straight for disaster". In February 1966, Kennedy released a peace plan that called for preserving South Vietnam while at the same time allowing the National Liberation Front, better known as the Viet Cong, to join a coalition government in Saigon. When asked by reporters if he was speaking on behalf of Johnson, Kennedy replied: "I don't think anyone has ever suggested that I was speaking for the White House". Kennedy's peace plan made front page news with The New York Times calling it a break with the president while the Chicago Tribunal labelled him in an editorial "Ho Chi Kennedy". Vice President Humphrey on a visit to New Zealand stated that Kennedy's "peace recipe" included "a dose of arsenic" while the National Security Adviser McGeorge Bundy quoted to the press Kennedy's remarks from 1963 saying he was against including Communists in coalition governments (though Kennedy's subject was Germany, not Vietnam). Kennedy was displeased when he heard anti-war protesters chanting his name, saying "I'm not Wayne Morse". To put aside reports of a rift with Johnson, Kennedy flew with Johnson on Air Force One on a trip to New York on February 23, 1966, and barely clapped his hands in approval when Johnson denied waging a war of conquest in Vietnam. In an interview with the Today program, Kennedy conceded that his views on Vietnam were "a little confusing".  

In April 1966, Kennedy had a private meeting with Philip Heymann of the State Department's Bureau of Security and Consular Affairs to discuss efforts to secure the release of American prisoners of war in Vietnam. Kennedy wanted to press the Johnson administration to do more, but Heymann insisted that the administration believed the "consequences of sitting down with the Viet Cong" mattered more than the prisoners they were holding captive. On June 29 of that year, Kennedy released a statement disavowing President Johnson's choice to bomb Haiphong, but he avoided criticizing either the war or the president's overall foreign policy, believing that it might harm Democratic candidates in the 1966 midterm elections. In August, the International Herald Tribune described Kennedy's popularity as outpacing President Johnson's, crediting Kennedy's attempts to end the Vietnam conflict which the public increasingly desired.

In the early part of 1967, Kennedy traveled to Europe, where he had discussions about Vietnam with leaders and diplomats. A story leaked to the State Department that Kennedy was talking about seeking peace while President Johnson was pursuing the war. Johnson became convinced that Kennedy was undermining his authority. He voiced this during a meeting with Kennedy, who reiterated the interest of the European leaders to pause the bombing while going forward with negotiations; Johnson declined to do so. On March 2, Kennedy outlined a three-point plan to end the war which included suspending the U.S. bombing of North Vietnam, and the eventual withdrawal of American and North Vietnamese soldiers from South Vietnam; this plan was rejected by Secretary of State Dean Rusk, who believed North Vietnam would never agree to it. On May 15, Kennedy debated Governor of California Ronald Reagan about the war. On November 26, 1967, during an appearance on Face the Nation, Kennedy asserted that the Johnson administration had deviated from his brother's policies in Vietnam, his first time contrasting the two administrations' policies on the war. He added that the view that Americans were fighting to end communism in Vietnam was "immoral".Clarke, p. 32.

On February 8, 1968, Kennedy delivered an address in Chicago, where he critiqued Saigon "government corruption" and expressed his disagreement with the Johnson administration's stance that the war would determine the future of Asia. On March 14, Kennedy met with defense secretary Clark Clifford at the Pentagon regarding the war. Clifford's notes indicate that Kennedy was offering not to enter the ongoing Democratic presidential primary if President Johnson would admit publicly to having been wrong in his war policy and appoint "a group of persons to conduct a study in depth of the issues and come up with a recommended course of action"; Johnson rejected the proposal. On April 1, after President Johnson halted bombing of North Vietnam, RFK said the decision was a "step toward peace" and, though offering to collaborate with Johnson for national unity, opted to continue his presidential bid. On May 1, while in Lafayette, Indiana, Kennedy said continued delays in beginning peace talks with North Vietnam meant both more lives lost and the postponing of the "domestic progress" hoped for by the US. Later that month, Kennedy called the war "the gravest kind of error" in a speech in Corvallis, Oregon. In an interview on June 4, hours before he was shot, Kennedy continued to advocate for a change in policy towards the war.

Despite his criticism of the Vietnam War and the South Vietnam government, Kennedy also stated in his 1968 campaign brochure that he did not support either a simple withdrawal or a surrender in South Vietnam and favored instead a change in the course of action taken so it would bring an "honorable peace."

Presidential candidate

In 1968 President Johnson prepared to run for re-election. In January, faced with what was widely considered an unrealistic race against an incumbent president, Kennedy stated that he would not seek the presidency. After the Tet Offensive in Vietnam in early February 1968, he received a letter from writer Pete Hamill that said poor people kept pictures of President Kennedy on their walls and that Kennedy had an "obligation of staying true to whatever it was that put those pictures on those walls."

Kennedy traveled to Delano, California, to meet with civil rights activist César Chávez, who was on a 25-day hunger strike showing his commitment to nonviolence. It was on this visit to California that Kennedy decided he would challenge Johnson for the presidency, telling his former Justice Department aides, Edwin Guthman and Peter Edelman, that his first step was to get lesser-known Senator Eugene McCarthy of Minnesota to drop out of the presidential race.

The weekend before the New Hampshire primary, Kennedy announced to several aides that he would attempt to persuade McCarthy to withdraw from the race to avoid splitting the antiwar vote, but Senator George McGovern urged Kennedy to wait until after that primary to announce his candidacy. Johnson won a narrow victory in the New Hampshire primary on March 12, 1968, against McCarthy, but this close second-place result dramatically boosted McCarthy's standing in the race.

After much speculation, and reports leaking out about his plans, and seeing in McCarthy's success that Johnson's hold on the job was not as strong as originally thought, Kennedy declared his candidacy on March 16, 1968, in the Caucus Room of the old Senate office building, the same room where his brother had declared his own candidacy eight years earlier. He stated, "I do not run for the presidency merely to oppose any man, but to propose new policies. I run because I am convinced that this country is on a perilous course and because I have such strong feelings about what must be done, and I feel that I'm obliged to do all I can."

McCarthy supporters angrily denounced Kennedy as an opportunist. They believed that McCarthy had taken the most courageous stand by opposing the sitting president of his own party and that his surprising result in New Hampshire had earned him the mantle of being the anti-war candidate. Kennedy's announcement split the anti-war movement in two. On March 31, 1968, Johnson stunned the nation by dropping out of the race. Vice President Hubert Humphrey, a champion of the labor unions and a long supporter of civil rights, entered the race with the financial backing and critical endorsement of the party "establishment", including most members of Congress, mayors, governors, "the south", and several major labor unions. With state registration deadlines long past, Humphrey joined the race too late to enter any primaries but had the support of the president.Schlesinger (2002) [1978], p. 884. Kennedy, like his brother before him, planned to win the nomination through popular support in the primaries.

Kennedy ran on a platform of racial and economic justice, non-aggression in foreign policy, decentralization of power, and social change. A crucial element of his campaign was an engagement with the young, whom he identified as being the future of a reinvigorated American society based on partnership and equality. His policy objectives did not sit well with the business community, where he was viewed as something of a fiscal liability, opposed as they were to the tax increases necessary to fund social programs. At one of his university speeches (Indiana University Medical School), he was asked, "Where are we going to get the money to pay for all these new programs you're proposing?" He replied to the medical students, about to enter lucrative careers, "From you."Newfield, Jack. (1988) [1969]. Robert Kennedy: A Memoir. Plume

It was this intense and frank mode of dialogue with which he was to continue to engage those whom he viewed as not being traditional allies of Democratic ideals or initiatives. In a speech at the University of Alabama, he argued, "I believe that any who seek high office this year must go before all Americans, not just those who agree with them, but also those who disagree, recognizing that it is not just our supporters, not just those who vote for us, but all Americans who we must lead in the difficult years ahead." He aroused rabid animosity in some quarters, with J. Edgar Hoover's Deputy Clyde Tolson reported as saying, "I hope that someone shoots and kills the son of a bitch."

Kennedy's presidential campaign brought out both "great enthusiasm" and anger in people. His message of change raised hope for some and brought fear to others. Kennedy wanted to be a bridge across the divide of American society. His bid for the presidency saw not only a continuation of the programs he and his brother had undertaken during the president's term in office, but also an extension of Johnson's Great Society.

Kennedy visited numerous small towns and made himself available to the masses by participating in long motorcades and street-corner stump speeches, often in troubled inner cities. He made urban poverty a chief concern of his campaign, which in part led to enormous crowds that would attend his events in poor urban areas or rural parts of Appalachia.

On April 4, 1968, Kennedy learned of the assassination of Martin Luther King Jr. and gave a heartfelt impromptu speech in Indianapolis's inner city, calling for a reconciliation between the races. The address was the first time Kennedy spoke publicly about his brother's killing. Riots broke out in 60 cities in the wake of King's death, but not in Indianapolis, a fact many attribute to the effect of this speech. Kennedy addressed the City Club of Cleveland the next day, on April 5, 1968, delivering the famous On the Mindless Menace of Violence speech. He attended King's funeral, accompanied by Jacqueline and Ted Kennedy. He was described as being the "only white politician to hear only cheers and applause."

Despite Kennedy's high profile and name recognition, McCarthy won most of the early primaries, including Kennedy's native state of Massachusetts. Kennedy won the Indiana Democratic primary on May 7 with 42 percent of the vote, and the Nebraska primary on May 14 with 52 percent of the vote. On May 28, Kennedy lost the Oregon primary, marking the first time a Kennedy lost an election, and it was assumed that McCarthy was the preferred choice among the young voters. If he could defeat McCarthy in the California primary, the leadership of the campaign thought, he would knock McCarthy out of the race and set up a one-on-one against Vice President Humphrey at the Chicago national convention in August.

Assassination

Kennedy scored major victories when he won both the California and South Dakota primaries on June 4. He addressed his supporters shortly after midnight on June 5, 1968, in a ballroom at The Ambassador Hotel in Los Angeles. Leaving the ballroom, he went through the hotel kitchen after being told it was a shortcut to a press room. He did this despite being advised by his bodyguard—former FBI agent Bill Barry—to avoid the kitchen. In a crowded kitchen passageway, Kennedy turned to his left and shook hands with hotel busboy Juan Romero just as Sirhan Sirhan, a 24-year-old Palestinian, opened fire with a .22-caliber revolver. Kennedy was hit three times, and five other people were wounded.

George Plimpton, former decathlete Rafer Johnson, and former professional football player Rosey Grier are credited with wrestling Sirhan to the ground after he shot the senator. As Kennedy lay mortally wounded, Romero cradled his head and placed a rosary in his hand. Kennedy asked Romero, "Is everybody OK?", and Romero responded, "Yes, everybody's OK." Kennedy then turned away from Romero and said, "Everything's going to be OK." After several minutes, medical attendants arrived and lifted the senator onto a stretcher, prompting him to whisper, "Don't lift me", which were his last words. He lost consciousness shortly thereafter. Despite extensive neurosurgery to remove the bullet and bone fragments from his brain, Kennedy was pronounced dead at 1:44 a.m. (PDT) on June 6, nearly 26 hours after the shooting.

Robert Kennedy's death, like the 1963 assassination of his brother, President John F. Kennedy, has been the subject of conspiracy theories.

Funeral
Kennedy's body was returned to Manhattan, where it lay in repose at Saint Patrick's Cathedral from approximately 10:00 p.m. until 10:00 a.m. on June 8. A high requiem Mass was held at the cathedral at 10:00 a.m. on June 8. The service was attended by members of the extended Kennedy family, President Lyndon B. Johnson and his wife Lady Bird Johnson, and members of the Johnson cabinet. Ted, the only surviving Kennedy brother, said the following:

The requiem Mass concluded with the hymn "The Battle Hymn of the Republic", sung by Andy Williams. Immediately following the Mass, Kennedy's body was transported by a special private train to Washington, D.C. Kennedy's funeral train was pulled by two Penn Central GG1 electric locomotives. Thousands of mourners lined the tracks and stations along the route, paying their respects as the train passed. The train departed New York Penn Station at 12:30 pm. When it arrived in Elizabeth, New Jersey, an eastbound train on a parallel track to the funeral train hit and killed two spectators and seriously injured four, after they were unable to get off the track in time, even though the eastbound train's engineer had slowed to 30 mph for the normally 55 mph curve, blown his horn continuously, and rung his bell through the curve.Wicker, Tom. President Joins Kennedys in Tribute at Graveside. The New York Times. June 9, 1968. The normally four-hour trip took more than eight hours because of the thick crowds lining the tracks on the  journey. The train was scheduled to arrive at about 4:30 pm,Madden, Richard L. "Kennedy Will Be Buried a Few Steps From the Arlington Grave of His Brother." New York Times. June 8, 1968. but sticking brakes on the casket-bearing car contributed to delays, and the train finally arrived at 9:10 p.m. on June 8.

Burial

Kennedy was buried close to his brother John in Arlington National Cemetery in Arlington, Virginia, just across the Potomac River from Washington, D.C. Although he had always maintained that he wished to be buried in Massachusetts, his family believed Robert should be interred in Arlington next to his brother. The procession left Union Station and passed the New Senate Office Building, where he had his offices, and then proceeded to the Lincoln Memorial, where it paused. The Marine Corps Band played The Battle Hymn of the Republic. The funeral motorcade arrived at the cemetery at 10:24 pm. As the vehicles entered the cemetery, people lining the roadway spontaneously lit candles to guide the motorcade to the burial site.

The 15-minute ceremony began at 10:30 p.m. Cardinal Patrick O'Boyle, Roman Catholic Archbishop of Washington, officiated at the graveside service in lieu of Cardinal Richard Cushing of Boston, who fell ill during the trip. Also officiating was Archbishop of New York Terence Cooke. On behalf of the United States, John Glenn presented the folded flag to Senator Ted Kennedy, who passed it to Robert's eldest son, Joe, who passed it to Ethel Kennedy. The Navy Band played The Navy Hymn.

Officials at Arlington National Cemetery said that Kennedy's burial was the only night burial to have taken place at the cemetery. (The re-interment of Patrick Bouvier Kennedy, who died two days after his birth in August 1963, and a stillborn daughter, Arabella, both children of President Kennedy and his wife, Jacqueline, also occurred at night.) After the president was interred in Arlington Cemetery, the two infants were buried next to him on December 5, 1963, in a private ceremony without publicity. His brother, Senator Edward M. Kennedy, was also buried at night, in 2009.

On June 9, President Lyndon B. Johnson assigned security staff to all U.S. presidential candidates and declared an official national day of mourning. After the assassination, the mandate of the U.S. Secret Service was altered by Congress to include the protection of U.S. presidential candidates.

Personal life
Children

On June 17, 1950, Kennedy married socialite Ethel Skakel, the third daughter of businessman George and Ann Skakel (née Brannack), at St. Mary's Catholic Church in Greenwich, Connecticut. The couple had 11 children:, Kathleen in 1951, Joseph in 1952, Robert in 1954, David in 1955, Mary Courtney in 1956, Michael in 1958, Mary Kerry in 1959, Christopher in 1963, Matthew in 1965, Dogulas in 1967, and Rory in 1968.

Kennedy owned a home at the well-known Kennedy compound on Cape Cod, in Hyannis Port, Massachusetts, but spent most of his time at his estate in McLean, Virginia, known as Hickory Hill (west of Washington, D.C.). His widow, Ethel, and their children continued to live at Hickory Hill after his death. Ethel Kennedy sold Hickory Hill for $8.25 million in 2009.

Attitudes and approach
Kennedy was said to be the gentlest and shyest of the family, as well as the least articulate verbally. By the time he was a young boy, his grandmother, Josie Fitzgerald, worried he would become a "sissy". His mother had a similar concern, as he was the "smallest and thinnest", but soon afterward, the family discovered "there was no fear of that". Family friend Lem Billings met Kennedy when he was eight years old and would later reflect that he loved him, adding that Kennedy "was the nicest little boy I ever met". Billings also said Kennedy was barely noticed "in the early days, but that's because he didn't bother anybody". Luella Hennessey, who became the nurse for the Kennedy children when Kennedy was 12, called him "the most thoughtful and considerate" of his siblings.

Kennedy was teased by his siblings, as in their family it was a norm for humor to be displayed in that fashion. He would turn jokes on himself or remain silent. Despite his gentle demeanor, he could be outspoken, and once engaged a priest in a public argument that horrified his mother, who later conceded that he had been correct all along. Even when arguing for a noble cause, his comments could have "a cutting quality".

Although Joe Kennedy's most ambitious dreams centered around Bobby's older brothers, Bobby maintained the code of personal loyalty that seemed to infuse the life of his family. His competitiveness was admired by his father and elder brothers, while his loyalty bound them more affectionately close.

A rather timid child, he was often the target of his father's dominating temperament. Working on the campaigns of older brother John, he was more involved, passionate, and tenacious than the candidate himself, obsessed with detail, fighting out every battle, and taking workers to task. He had always been closer to John than the other members of the family.

Kennedy's opponents on Capitol Hill maintained that his collegiate magnanimity was sometimes hindered by a tenacious and somewhat impatient manner. His professional life was dominated by the same attitudes that governed his family life: a certainty that good humor and leisure must be balanced by service and accomplishment. Schlesinger comments that Kennedy could be both the most ruthlessly diligent and yet generously adaptable of politicians, at once both temperamental and forgiving. In this he was very much his father's son, lacking truly lasting emotional independence, and yet possessing a great desire to contribute. He lacked the innate self-confidence of his contemporaries yet found a greater self-assurance in the experience of married life, an experience that he stated had given him a base of self-belief from which to continue his efforts in the public arena.

Upon hearing yet again the assertion that he was "ruthless", Kennedy once joked to a reporter, "If I find out who has called me ruthless I will destroy him." He also confessed to possessing a bad temper that required self-control: "My biggest problem as counsel is to keep my temper. I think we all feel that when a witness comes before the United States Senate, he has an obligation to speak frankly and tell the truth. To see people sit in front of us and lie and evade makes me boil inside. But you can't lose your temper; if you do, the witness has gotten the best of you."

Attorney Michael O'Donnell wrote, "[Kennedy] offered that most intoxicating of political aphrodisiacs: authenticity. He was blunt to a fault, and his favorite campaign activity was arguing with college students. To many, his idealistic opportunism was irresistible."

In his earlier life, Kennedy had developed a reputation as the family's attack dog. He was a hostile cross-examiner on Joseph McCarthy's Senate committee; a fixer and leg-breaker as JFK's campaign manager; an unforgiving and merciless cutthroat—his father's son right down to Joseph Kennedy's purported observation that "he hates like me." Yet Bobby Kennedy somehow became a liberal icon, an antiwar visionary who tried to outflank Lyndon Johnson's Great Society from the left.

On Kennedy's ideological development, his brother John once remarked, "He might once have been intolerant of liberals as such because his early experience was with that high-minded, high-speaking kind who never got anything done. That all changed the moment he met a liberal like Walter Reuther."

Religious faith and Greek philosophy
Kennedy's Catholicism was central to his politics and personal attitude to life and its purpose; he inherited his faith from his family. He was more religious than his brothers and approached his duties with a Catholic worldview. He faithfully attended Catholic Mass and often "stepped over the rail to help out if he saw that an altar boy was missing and the priest needed a hand". John Seigenthaler remarked that Kennedy had a "strange fascination" with the Polish nation, being impressed with the Polish struggle for independence and their deep commitment to Catholicism.

Throughout his life, Kennedy made reference to his faith, how it informed every area of his life, and how it gave him the strength to reenter politics after his brother's assassination. Historian Evan Thomas calls Kennedy a "romantic Catholic who believed that it was possible to create the Kingdom of Heaven on earth". He was deeply shaken by anti-Catholicism he encountered during his brother's presidential campaign in 1960, especially that of Protestant intellectuals and journalists. That year, Kennedy said, "Anti-Catholicism is the anti-semitism of the intellectuals."

Robert Kennedy also pressured the Catholic hierarchy to move toward progressivism. In 1966, he visited Pope Paul VI and urged him to address the misery and poverty of South Africa's black population. In 1967, he asked Paul to adapt more liberal rhetoric and extend the Church's appeal to Hispanics.

In the last years of his life, Kennedy also found solace in the playwrights and poets of ancient Greece, especially Aeschylus, suggested to him by Jacqueline after JFK's death. In his Indianapolis speech on April 4, 1968, on the day of the assassination of Martin Luther King Jr., Kennedy quoted these lines from Aeschylus:

Even in our sleep, pain which cannot forget falls drop by drop upon the heart, until, in our own despair, against our will, comes wisdom through the awful grace of God.

 Legacy 

Kennedy was the first sibling of a president of the United States to serve as U.S. Attorney General. Biographer Evan Thomas wrote that at times Kennedy misused his powers by "modern standards", but concluded, "on the whole, even counting his warts, he was a great attorney general." Walter Isaacson commented that Kennedy "turned out arguably to be the best attorney general in history", praising him for his championing of civil rights and other initiatives of the administration. As Kennedy stepped down from being attorney general in 1964 to assume the office of senator from New York, The New York Times, notably having criticized his appointment three years prior, praised Kennedy for raising the standards of the position. Some of his successor attorneys general have been unfavorably compared to him, for not displaying the same level of poise in the profession. Near the end of his time in office as attorney general under Barack Obama, Eric Holder cited Kennedy as the inspiration for his belief that the Justice Department could be "a force for that which is right."

Kennedy has also been praised for his oratorical abilities and his skill at creating unity. Joseph A. Palermo of The Huffington Post observed that Kennedy's words "could cut through social boundaries and partisan divides in a way that seems nearly impossible today." Dolores Huerta and Philip W. Johnston expressed the view that Kennedy, both in his speeches and actions, was unique in his willingness to take political risks. That blunt sincerity was said by associates to be authentic; Frank N. Magill wrote that Kennedy's oratorical skills lent their support to minorities and other disenfranchised groups who began seeing him as an ally.

Kennedy's assassination was a blow to the optimism for a brighter future that his campaign had brought for many Americans who lived through the turbulent 1960s. Juan Romero, the busboy who shook hands with Kennedy right before he was shot, later said, "It made me realize that no matter how much hope you have it can be taken away in a second."

Kennedy's death has been cited as a significant factor in the Democratic Party's loss of the 1968 presidential election. Since his passing, Kennedy has become generally well-respected by liberals and conservatives, which is far from the polarized views of him during his lifetime. Joe Scarborough, John Ashcroft, Tom Bradley, Mark Dayton, John Kitzhaber, Max Cleland, Tim Cook, Phil Bredesen, Joe Biden, J. K. Rowling, Jim McGreevey, Gavin Newsom, and Ray Mabus have acknowledged Kennedy's influence on them. Josh Zeitz of Politico observed, "Bobby Kennedy has since become an American folk hero—the tough, crusading liberal gunned down in the prime of life."

Kennedy's (and to a lesser extent his older brother's) ideas about using government authority to assist less fortunate peoples became central to American liberalism as a tenet of the "Kennedy legacy".

Honors

In the months and years after Robert F. Kennedy's death, numerous roads, public schools, and other facilities across the United States have been named in his memory.

The Robert F. Kennedy Center for Justice and Human Rights was founded in 1968, with an international award program to recognize human rights activists.

The sports stadium in Washington, D.C., was renamed Robert F. Kennedy Memorial Stadium in 1969.

In 1978 the United States Congress awarded Kennedy the Congressional Gold Medal for distinguished service.

On January 12, 1979, a 15-cent commemorative U.S. Postal Service stamp (U.S. #1770) was issued in Washington.D.C., honoring R.F.K. The Bureau of Engraving and Printing distributed 159,297,600 of the perforated, blue-and-white stamps—an unusually-large printing. The stamp design was taken from a family photo suggested by his wife, Ethel.

In 1998 the United States Mint released the Robert F. Kennedy silver dollar, a special dollar coin that featured Kennedy's image on the obverse and the emblems of the United States Department of Justice and the United States Senate on the reverse.

On November 20, 2001, U.S. President George W. Bush and Attorney General John Ashcroft dedicated the Department of Justice headquarters building in Washington, D.C., as the Robert F. Kennedy Department of Justice Building, honoring Kennedy on what would have been his 76th birthday. They both spoke during the ceremony, as did Kennedy's eldest son, Joseph.

In a further effort to remember Kennedy and continue his work helping the disadvantaged, a small group of private citizens launched the Robert F. Kennedy Children's Action Corps in 1969. The private, nonprofit, Massachusetts-based organization helps more than 800 abused and neglected children each year.

A bust of Kennedy resides in the library of the University of Virginia School of Law where he obtained his law degree.

On June 4, 2008 (the eve of the 40th anniversary of his assassination), the New York State Assembly voted to rename the Triborough Bridge in New York City the Robert F. Kennedy Memorial Bridge. New York State Governor David Paterson signed the legislation into law on August 8, 2008. The bridge is now commonly known as the RFK-Triborough Bridge.

On September 20, 2016, the United States Navy announced the renaming of a refueling ship in honor of Kennedy during a ceremony attended by members of his family.

Personal items and documents from his office in the Justice Department Building are displayed in a permanent exhibit dedicated to him at the John F. Kennedy Library and Museum. Papers from his years as attorney general, senator, peace and civil rights activist and presidential candidate, as well as personal correspondence, are also housed in the library.

Established in 1984, the Robert F. Kennedy Assassination Archives stored at the University of Massachusetts Dartmouth contains thousands of copies of government documents obtained through the Freedom of Information Act public disclosure process as well as manuscripts, photographs, audiotape interviews, video tapes, news clippings and research notes compiled by journalists and other private citizens who have investigated discrepancies in the case.

Kennedy and Martin Luther King Jr.

Several public institutions jointly honor Kennedy and Martin Luther King Jr.
 In 1969, the former Woodrow Wilson Junior College, a two-year institution and a constituent campus of the City Colleges of Chicago, was renamed Kennedy–King College.
 In 1994 the City of Indianapolis erected the Landmark for Peace Memorial in Robert Kennedy's honor near the space made famous by his speech from the back of a pickup truck the night King died. The monument in Martin Luther King Jr. Memorial Park depicts a sculpture of RFK reaching out from a large metal slab to a sculpture of King, who is part of a similar slab. This is meant to symbolize their attempts in life to bridge the gaps between the races—an attempt that united them even in death. A state historical marker has also been placed at the site. A nephew of King and Indiana U.S. Congresswoman Julia Carson presided over the event; both made speeches from the back of a pickup truck in similar fashion to RFK's speech.

In 2019, Kennedy's "Speech on the Death of Dr. Martin Luther King, Jr." (April 4, 1968) was selected by the Library of Congress for preservation in the National Recording Registry for being "culturally, historically, or aesthetically significant".

Publications

 The Enemy Within: The McClellan Committee's Crusade Against Jimmy Hoffa and Corrupt Labor Unions (1960)
 Just Friends and Brave Enemies (1962)
 The Pursuit of Justice (1964)
 To Seek a Newer World, essays (1967)
 Thirteen Days: A Memoir of the Cuban Missile Crisis, published posthumously (1969)

Art, entertainment, and media

Kennedy has been the subject of several documentaries and has appeared in various works of popular culture. Kennedy's role in the Cuban Missile Crisis has been dramatized by Martin Sheen in the TV play The Missiles of October (1974) and by Steven Culp in Thirteen Days (2000). The film Bobby (2006) is the story of multiple people's lives leading up to RFK's assassination. The film employs stock footage from his presidential campaign, and he is briefly portrayed by Dave Fraunces. Barry Pepper won an Emmy for his portrayal of Kennedy in The Kennedys (2011), an 8-part miniseries. He is played by Peter Sarsgaard in the film about Jacqueline Kennedy, Jackie (2016). He is played by Jack Huston in Martin Scorsese's film The Irishman (2019).

See also
 Kennedy family tree
 List of assassinated American politicians
 List of peace activists
 List of United States Congress members killed or wounded in office
 List of United States Congress members who died in office (1950–1999)

References
Citations

Further reading

 
 Barnes, John A. Irish-American Landmarks. Canton, Mich.: Visible Ink, 1995.
 
 
 
 
 Grubin, David, director and producer, RFK. Video. (DVD, VHS). 2hr. WGBH Educ. Found. and David Grubin Productions, 2004. Distrib. by PBS Video
 
 Haas, Lawrence J. The Kennedys in the World: How Jack, Bobby, and Ted Remade America's Empire (2021) excerpt
 
 Hilty, James M. Robert Kennedy: Brother Protector (1997), vol. 1 to 1963. Temple U. Press., 1997.
 Martin, Zachary J. The Mindless Menace of Violence: Robert F. Kennedy's Vision and the Fierce Urgency of Now. Lanham, Md.: Hamilton Books, 2009.
 

 
  RFK's speech after the death of Martin Luther King in 1968.
 Navasky, Victor S. Kennedy Justice (1972). Argues the policies of RFK's Justice Department show the conservatism of justice, the limits of charisma, the inherent tendency in a legal system to support the status quo, and the counterproductive results of many of Kennedy's endeavors in the field of civil rights and crime control.
  Neff, James. Vendetta: Bobby Kennedy Versus Jimmy Hoffa (2016) excerpt
 
 
 
  National Book Award.
 Schlesinger, Arthur, M. Jr. (2002) [1978], Robert Kennedy And His Times, Mariner Books-Houghton Mifflin Co., .
  
 
 Schmitt, Edward R. President of the Other America: Robert Kennedy and the Politics of Poverty (University of Massachusetts Press, 2010) 324 pp. 

 Sullivan, Patricia (2021) Justice Rising: Robert Kennedy's America in Black and White (Harvard University Press,  2021)
  online free
 

External links

 
 FBI Records: The Vault – Robert F. Kennedy at fbi.gov
 Biography at United States Department of Justice
 
 Annotated Bibliography for Robert F. Kennedy from the Alsos Digital Library for Nuclear Issues 
 American Experience: RFK , PBS
 Text, Audio, and Video of Robert Kennedy's Remarks on the Assassination of Martin Luther King Jr.
 Edward Kennedy eulogy to Robert Kennedy (text and audio)
 My Father's Stand on Cuba Travel by Kathleen Kennedy Townsend, The Washington Post'', April 23, 2009
 Radio airchecks/recordings of the shooting and death of Senator Kennedy including Mutual Radio's Andrew West's shooting coverage, continued live coverage from CBS Radio, announcements of RFK's death, CBS Radio's complete coverage of funeral mass St. Patrick's Cathedral, and CBS Radio coverage of the train arrival of RFK's body in Washington DC.
 KTTV assassination coverage  at The Museum of Classic Chicago Television
 FBI file on the RFK assassination
 "The Robert F. Kennedy Assassination Archives" – a collection within the University of Massachusetts Dartmouth Archives and Special Collections established in 1984
 

 
1925 births
1968 deaths
1968 murders in the United States
20th-century American writers
20th-century American politicians
20th-century Roman Catholics
United States Navy personnel of World War II
Activists for African-American civil rights
American anti–Vietnam War activists
American anti-poverty advocates
American murder victims
American Roman Catholics
American people of Irish descent
American political scientists
Assassinated American politicians
Bates College people
Burials at Arlington National Cemetery
Civil rights movement
Catholics from Massachusetts
Catholics from New York (state)
Congressional Gold Medal recipients
People murdered in California
Deaths by firearm in California
Democratic Party United States senators from New York (state)
Harvard Crimson football players
Harvard College alumni
Kennedy administration cabinet members
Robert F
Liberalism in the United States
Lyndon B. Johnson administration cabinet members
Male murder victims
Massachusetts Democrats
Milton Academy alumni
Military personnel from Massachusetts
New York (state) Democrats
New York (state) lawyers
Nonviolence advocates
People educated at Gibbs School
People from Bronxville, New York
Politicians from Brookline, Massachusetts
People from McLean, Virginia
People murdered in Los Angeles
People of the Cold War
United States Attorneys General
United States Navy officers
1964 United States vice-presidential candidates
United States Senate lawyers
University of Virginia School of Law alumni
Writers from Boston
Writers from New York (state)
Riverdale Country School alumni
Portsmouth Abbey School alumni
The Boston Post people
20th-century political scientists